Hou Fenglian (born 11 July 1980 in Tianjin, China) is a Chinese baseball player who was a member of Team China at the 2008 Summer Olympics.

In 2007, he played for Team China in the Arizona Fall League.

Sports career
1991 Tianjin Xiqing Sports School (Baseball);
1996 Tianjin Municipal Team;
2000 National Team

Major performances
2005 National Games - Tianjin Team - 1st

References

External links
Profile 2008 Olympics Team China

1980 births
2009 World Baseball Classic players
Baseball players at the 2002 Asian Games
Baseball players at the 2006 Asian Games
Baseball players at the 2008 Summer Olympics
Baseball players at the 2010 Asian Games
Baseball players from Tianjin
Chinese baseball players
Living people
Olympic baseball players of China
Tianjin Lions players
Asian Games competitors for China
Chinese sportsmen
21st-century Chinese people